The 1890 St. Louis Browns season was the team's ninth season in St. Louis, Missouri and its ninth season in the American Association. The Browns went 78–58 during the season and finished third in the American Association.

Regular season

Season standings

Record vs. opponents

Roster

Player stats

Batting

Starters by position 
Note: Pos = Position; G = Games played; AB = At bats; H = Hits; Avg. = Batting average; HR = Home runs; RBI = Runs batted in

Other batters 
Note: G = Games played; AB = At bats; H = Hits; Avg. = Batting average; HR = Home runs; RBI = Runs batted in

Pitching

Starting pitchers 
Note: G = Games pitched; IP = Innings pitched; W = Wins; L = Losses; ERA = Earned run average; SO = Strikeouts

References 
1890 St. Louis Browns at Baseball Reference
1890 St. Louis Browns team page at www.baseball-almanac.com

St. Louis Cardinals seasons
Saint Louis Browns season
St Louis